María Elena Sarría Díaz (born September 14, 1954 in Cienfuegos) is a retired Cuban athlete who competed in the shot put during her career. Her personal best throw was 20.61 metres, and with 19.34 metres she still holds the Pan American Games record in the event.

International competitions

External links
 
 
 

1954 births
Living people
People from Cienfuegos
Cuban female shot putters
Olympic athletes of Cuba
Athletes (track and field) at the 1976 Summer Olympics
Athletes (track and field) at the 1980 Summer Olympics
Pan American Games gold medalists for Cuba
Pan American Games medalists in athletics (track and field)
Athletes (track and field) at the 1975 Pan American Games
Athletes (track and field) at the 1979 Pan American Games
Athletes (track and field) at the 1983 Pan American Games
Athletes (track and field) at the 1987 Pan American Games
World Athletics Championships athletes for Cuba
Central American and Caribbean Games gold medalists for Cuba
Competitors at the 1974 Central American and Caribbean Games
Competitors at the 1982 Central American and Caribbean Games
Pan American Games silver medalists for Cuba
Central American and Caribbean Games medalists in athletics
Medalists at the 1975 Pan American Games
Medalists at the 1979 Pan American Games
Medalists at the 1983 Pan American Games
Medalists at the 1987 Pan American Games
20th-century Cuban women